Common prickly pear is a common name which may refer to certain species of cactus in the genus Opuntia including:

Opuntia ficus-indica
Opuntia monacantha, native to South America
Opuntia stricta

Opuntia